Ik Doli (Urdu, Punjabi: اک ڈولی) is a Pakistani Punjabi film released on March 12, 1982.  The film was directed by M. Akram. The story was written by Hazeen Qadri and the music was composed by Nazir Ali.

Story 
Johnny Machhi (Sultan Rahi) was a 'Kahar'. From the village of Chaudhry (Ilyas Kashmiri) a 'doli' was about to travel on the shoulders of this 'Kahar' today. Chaudhry's daughter (Shama) Shano's doli that on this occasion Chaudhry's two nephews Badru and Jiro (Adib) and (Jagi Malik) attacked. They strongly asserted their right that Chaudhry's daughter Ming was ours. We will not let her doli go to a third house. Chaudhry revealed in clear words that both of you are considered by the society as the leaders of rogue elements. I am a noble man and I have married my daughter to another noble man.

Cast 
 Sultan Rahi 
 Mustafa Qureshi 
 Aasia 
 Ishrat Chaudhary
 Nazli
 Ilyas Kashmiri
 Imrozia
 Nanha
 Rangeela
 Khalid Saleem Mota
 Adeeb

Track listing

References

External links 
 

1982 films
1980s action comedy-drama films
Punjabi-language Pakistani films
1980s Punjabi-language films
Pakistani action comedy-drama films
1982 comedy films
1982 drama films